Bariga Boys is a 2009 Nigerian documentary about street performers Segun Adefila and the Crown Troupe, who use guerrilla theatre, music and drama to address issues of poverty in the slums of Bariga in Lagos.

References

Nigerian documentary films
Best Documentary Africa Movie Academy Award winners
2009 films
2009 documentary films
Films shot in Lagos
Documentary films about theatre
Street theatre
Documentary films about poverty